Deh Qotb ol Din (also Romanized as Deh Qoṭb ol Dīn and Deh Qoṭb od Dīn; also known as Qoṭb od Dīnbābād) is a village in Sharifabad Rural District, in the Central District of Sirjan County, Kerman Province, Iran. At the 2006 census, its population was 23, in 6 families.

References 

Populated places in Sirjan County